Roberto Figueroa (20 March 1904 – 24 January 1989) was a Uruguayan footballer who played for the Uruguay national team. He was a member of the squad which won the gold medal in 1928 Olympics.

Career
Born in Montevideo, Figueroa played club football for Montevideo Wanderers, where he won two league titles while scoring 75 goals in 331 matches. He was inducted into the club's hall of fame in 2009.

Figueroa made nine appearances for the Uruguay national football team from 1921 to 1933.

References

External links

profile
 

1904 births
1989 deaths
Uruguayan people of Spanish descent
Footballers from Montevideo
Uruguayan footballers
Footballers at the 1928 Summer Olympics
Olympic footballers of Uruguay
Olympic gold medalists for Uruguay
Uruguay international footballers
Uruguayan Primera División players
Montevideo Wanderers F.C. players
Club Nacional de Football players
Olympic medalists in football
Medalists at the 1928 Summer Olympics
Association football midfielders
Rampla Juniors players